The Kansas City Reentry Center is a minimum security state prison located in downtown Kansas City, Missouri.  In 2015, the state converted and renamed the facility from the prior Kansas City Community Release Center, which had released large numbers of parolees into the community.

References 

Prisons in Missouri
Buildings and structures in Jackson County, Missouri
2015 establishments in Missouri